Thiruneermalai is a southern suburb of Chennai, India. It lies in the Chengalpattu district. Originally a town panchayat, Thiruneermalai is now a part of Pammal Zone under Tambaram Municipal Corporation. The postal code of the neighbourhood is 600132.

Thiruneermalai is known for Sri Ranganathar Perumal Temple on a hill and down on Sri Neervanna Perumal. From the top of the hill, one can view the entire Pallavaram area. The temple is one of the 108 divyadesams.

Thiruneermalai area is one of the 163 notified areas (megalithic sites) in the state of Tamil Nadu.

Demographics 
  India census, Thiruneermalai had a population of 19,019. Males constitute 51% of the population and females 49%. Thiruneermalai has an average literacy rate of 79%, higher than the national average of 59.5%: male literacy is 84%, and female literacy is 74%. Many of the people already have college degrees. In Thiruneermalai, 11% of the population is under 14 years of age.

References

External links 
 About Neelamugilvanna Perumal

Suburbs of Chennai
Hindu temples in Chennai
Cities and towns in Chengalpattu district